Yugamash (Yögämeş) is a rural locality (a selo) in Yamadinsky Selsoviet, Yanaulsky District, Bashkortostan, Russia. The population was 273 as of 2010. There are 6 streets.

Geography 
Yugamash is located 38 km southeast of Yanaul (the district's administrative centre) by road. Andreyevka is the nearest rural locality.

References 

Rural localities in Yanaulsky District